is a Japanese footballer who plays for Iwate Grulla Morioka.

National team career
In October 2013, Nakano was elected Japan U-17 national team for 2013 U-17 World Cup. He played 2 matches.

Club statistics
Updated to 2 January 2020.

References

External links

Profile at Tokyo Verdy

1996 births
Living people
Association football people from Saitama Prefecture
Japanese footballers
J2 League players
J3 League players
Japan Football League players
Tokyo Verdy players
FC Imabari players
Iwate Grulla Morioka players
Association football midfielders